Bank Top can be one of the following places:

Bank Top, Northumberland
Bank Top, West Yorkshire, a settlement in Calderdale
Darlington railway station, also known as Bank Top

See also